Rinriyuq (Quechua rinri ear, -yuq a suffix, "the one with an ear (or ears)",  also spelled Rinrioc) is mountain in the Cordillera Central in the Andes of Peru which reaches a height of approximately . It is located in the Lima Region, Yauyos Province, on the border of the districts of Huancaya and  Vitis, west of Huancaya.

References 

Mountains of Lima Region
Mountains of Peru